Daniel Holyoak (born 27 November 1983) is an English former professional footballer who played in the Football League for Mansfield Town.

References

1983 births
Living people
English footballers
Association football midfielders
English Football League players
Mansfield Town F.C. players
Kettering Town F.C. players
King's Lynn F.C. players
Ilkeston Town F.C. (1945) players
Stamford A.F.C. players
Spalding United F.C. players